In enzymology, a beta-galactoside alpha-2,3-sialyltransferase is an enzyme that catalyzes the chemical reaction

CMP-N-acetylneuraminate + beta-D-galactosyl-1,3-N-acetyl-alpha-D-galactosaminyl-R  CMP + alpha-N-acetylneuraminyl-2,3-beta-D-galactosyl-1,3-N-acetyl-alpha-D- galactosaminyl-R

Thus, the two substrates of this enzyme are CMP-N-acetylneuraminate and beta-D-galactosyl-1,3-N-acetyl-alpha-D-galactosaminyl-R, whereas its 3 products are CMP, alpha-N-acetylneuraminyl-2,3-beta-D-galactosyl-1,3-N-acetyl-alpha-D-, and galactosaminyl-R.

This enzyme belongs to the family of transferases, specifically those glycosyltransferases that do not transfer hexosyl or pentosyl groups.  The systematic name of this enzyme class is CMP-N-acetylneuraminate:beta-D-galactoside alpha-2,3-N-acetylneuraminyl-transferase. This enzyme participates in 7 metabolic pathways: o-glycan biosynthesis, keratan sulfate biosynthesis, glycosphingolipid biosynthesis - lactoseries, glycosphingolipid biosynthesis - globoseries, glycosphingolipid biosynthesis - ganglioseries, glycan structures - biosynthesis 1, and glycan structures - biosynthesis 2.

Structural studies

References

 
 

EC 2.4.99
Enzymes of known structure